Björgvin Björgvinsson (born 11 January 1980, in Dalvík) is an Icelandic alpine skier who competed for Iceland at the 2006 Winter Olympics. He speaks Icelandic and German. He also competed for Iceland at the 2010 Winter Olympics and was selected as his nation's flag bearer at the opening ceremony.

References 

Icelandic male alpine skiers
Olympic alpine skiers of Iceland
Alpine skiers at the 2002 Winter Olympics
Alpine skiers at the 2006 Winter Olympics
Alpine skiers at the 2010 Winter Olympics
People from Dalvík
1980 births
Living people
Icelandic male skiers
21st-century Icelandic people